San Antonio del Golfo is a town in Sucre State, Venezuela. It is the capital of the Mejía Municipality.

Populated places in Sucre (state)